Vaske is a surname. Notable people with the surname include:

Dennis Vaske (born 1967), American ice hockey player
Thomas Vaske, German sprint canoeist